Sir Robert Akenhead (born 15 September 1949), styled The Hon. Mr Justice Akenhead, is a British judge. He was previously a QC and Head of Chambers at Atkin Chambers, and has been a specialist in construction law since 1973.

He was educated at Rugby School and Exeter University. Called to the Bar, Inner Temple, in 1972, he later became a Bencher in 1997. He officiated as an Assistant Recorder between 1991 and 1994 and as a Recorder from 1994 until 2007, when he was appointed a Judge of the High Court, Queen's Bench Division. In recognition of his appointment, he was also conferred with a knighthood in October 2007.

References

External links
 UK Government's Judiciary List site

1949 births
Living people
Alumni of the University of Exeter
20th-century English judges
21st-century English judges
English barristers
English King's Counsel
Knights Bachelor
Members of the Inner Temple
People educated at Rugby School
Queen's Bench Division judges
20th-century King's Counsel